Adari is a town and a nagar panchayat in Mau district in the Indian state of Uttar Pradesh, Indara junction is the nearest railway station.

Demographics
 India census, Adari had a population of 12,006. Males constitute 52% of the population and females 48%. Adari has an average literacy rate of 55%, lower than the national average of 59.5%; with 60% of the males and 40% of females literate. About 22% of the population is under 6 years of age.

References

Cities and towns in Mau district